Chetamon Mountain is a  mountain summit located in Jasper National Park, in the De Smet Range of the Canadian Rockies in Alberta, Canada. Its nearest higher peak is Cliff Mountain,  to the northwest.

Chetamon Mountain is a name derived from the Stoney language meaning "squirrel". The mountain was named in 1916 by Morrison P. Bridgland because two rocks on the peak's arête had the appearance a squirrel. Bridgland (1878-1948) was a Dominion Land Surveyor who named many peaks in Jasper Park and the Canadian Rockies. The mountain's name was officially adopted in 1956 by the Geographical Names Board of Canada. 


Climate

Based on the Köppen climate classification, Chetamon Mountain is located in a subarctic climate with cold, snowy winters, and mild summers. Precipitation runoff from Chetamon Mountain flows into the Athabasca River via the Snaring River and Cobblestone Creek.

See also
 Geography of Alberta

References

External links
 Parks Canada web site: Jasper National Park

Two-thousanders of Alberta
Alberta's Rockies
Mountains of Jasper National Park